Dr. Papineni Sivasankar (born 1953), a doyen of Modern Literature in Telugu, recipient of Sahitya Akademi Award, 2016 is an Indian poet, short story writer, and critic.

He has published 52 books including five poetry collections, three short story collections, five essay collections and 39 anthologies. His poetry collections and short story collections were translated into other languages such as English, Hindi, Tamil, Kannada, and Malayalam.

His notable works  are Rajani Gandha (2013), Matti Gunde (Heart of the Soil 1992) Sahityam-Moulika Bhavanalu (Literature-Basic Concepts 1996) and Talli! Ninnu Dalanchi.

Early life and career 
Born on Vijaya Dipavali 1953 in the village Nekkallu, Guntur district, Andhra Pradesh, India. His father Venkata Krishnarao was a former and mother Santamma was a housewife. Sivasankar completed his schooling at K.V.R.Z.P.H.School, Tulluru. He did his B.A. at JKC College, Guntur and stood first in Andhra University with Prabhala Sundararamayya Pantulu Gold Medal in 1974. He received his Master of Arts degree in 1976 at Andhra University, Nallapadu branch again with Telikicherla Venkataratnam Gold Medal. His Ph.D. thesis Sahityam - Konni Moulika Bhavanalu won Tumati Donappa Gold Medal as the best thesis from Acharya Nagarjuna University in 1989. He married Gruha Lakshmi in 1977 and with her had two daughters, Srujana and Spandana. And he joined B.S.S.B. College, Tadikonda as Telugu Lecturer in 1977 and retired as principal of that college in 2010.

Literary works 
Starting with Stabdhata-Chalanam in 1984 Sivasankar published five poetry collections in which the award-winning Rajani Gandha (2013) is significant. Dr. Papineni's greatness as a poet lies in his vibrant expression, fertile imagination, grandeur of thought and finest human sensibility. His first poem in free verse Cheekati nundi Vekuvaku was published in Dipavali Special issue of Andhra Jyothi in 1980. And his first short story Kalupu Mokka was published in Prajatantra weekly, in April 1977. Mattigunde was acclaimed as one of the 100 best short stories of 20th century. And Samudram is a unique narrative experiment in second person about the loss of succession to human intellect. Dr. Papineni published three short story collections. His short stories reflect the struggles of farmers, the impact of globalisation on villages in general, and the unrest and distress of human beings in particular. He brought out five books of criticism to his credit including Sahityam-Moulika Bhavanalu. As a critic, Sivasankar evaluated the merits of the classical poetry in Telugu. And with his insights in sociological theories he evolved many a concept like Avicchinnata (Continuity), Nisargata (Spontaneity), Parayitanam (Alienation) to analyze modern Telugu literature.
In his exhaustive interview with Dr. C. Mrunalini Sivasankar revealed his exploration in Telugu literature and social culture as well.

Awards and Accolades 
 The Sahitya Akademi Award, 2016 for his poetry collection Rajani Gandha
 Free Verse Front Award, Hyderabad, 1985
 Dr. Garikapati Kavita Puraskaram, Rajahmundry, 09 May 1991
 Jyeshta Sahithi Award, Visakhapatnam, 1993
 Ummidisetty Award, Tadipatri, 1993
 Dr. C. Narayana Reddy Award, Karimnagar, 1999
 Telugu University Vachana Kavitha Puraskaram (1999), Hyderabad, 30 December 2000 
 Nutalapati Literary Award, Tirupathi, 15 November 2000
 Nagabhairava Kalapeetham Award, Ongole, 2002
 Andhra Pradesh Adhikara Bhasha Puraskaram, Tirupati, 28 March 2003
 Andhra Pradesh State Best Teacher Award, 05 September 2003
 Akashvani National First Prize (2004) for 'Chivari Picchika', Trivendram, 05 September 2005
 Viswakalapeetham Snehanidhi Puraskaram, Hyderabad, 01 January 2006
 Visalandhra-Sunkara Sahithi Satkaram, Ongole, 2006
 Dr. Kethu Viswanatha Reddy Katha Puraskaram, Nandaluru, 13 July 2008
 Dr. Avamtsa Soma Sundar Kavitha Puraskaram, Pithapuram, 18 November 2010
 Andhra Nataka Kala Samithi Award, Bezawada, 2012
 Navyandhra Rastra Ugadi Visishta Puraskaram, Anantavaram, 2015
 Srujana Sahithi Puraskaram, Addanki, 16 August 2015
 Devarakonda Balagangadhara Tilak Puraskaram, Tanuku, 29 August 2015
 Swarna Bharath Kavi Satkaram, Gannavaram, 2016
 Bollimuntha Sahithi Satkaram, Tenali, 2017
 Bharathi Samithi Puraskaram, Gudivada, 12 February 2017
 G.S.V. Sahitee Puraskaram, Tanuku, 2017
 Best National Poet honor by Prasara Bharati, Varanasi, 12 January 2017
 Viswadaata Kasinathuni NageswaraRao Pantulu Award, Elakurru, 08 May 2017
 Pucchalapalli Sundarayya Kala Puraskaram, Yadlapadu, 20 May 2017
 Mahakavi Jashua Award, Guntur, 2017
 Mahakavi Tummala Kalapeetham Puraskaram, Guntur, 16 December 2019
 Addepalli RamaMohanaRao Vimarsa Puraskaram, Kakinada, 11 December 2021
 HanumaReddy Sahitee Puraskaram, Ongolu, 24 April 2022
 Jashua Sahitee Puraskaram, Guntur, 27 September 2022
 Kaviraju Tripuraneni Ramaswamy Puraskaram, Guntur, 09 January 2023.

Bibliography 
 Stabdhata-Chalanam (Free Verse) (1984)
 Oka Saaramsam Kosam (Free Verse) (1990)
 Mattigunde (Short Stories) (1992)
 Sahityam-Moulika Bhavanalu (Research Thesis) (1996)
 Aku Pacchani Lokamlo (Free Verse) (1998)
 Oka Khadgam Oka Pushpam (Free Verse) (2004)
 Sagam Terichina Talupu (Short Stories) (2008)
 Nisanta (Critical Essays) (2008)
 Talli! Ninnu Dalanchi (Commentary on Classical Poetry) (2012)
 Rajani Gandha (Free verse) (2013)
 Dravadhuikata (Social Critique) (2015)
 Maha Swapnikudu (Essays on Sri Sri) (2016)
 Veda Vyasam (Monograph) (2019)
 Ankura (Padya Kavita) (2019)
 Nisarga (Critical Essays) (2019)
 Adarsa Moortulu (Children Stories) (2019)
 Maa Gokhale (Monograph) (2021)
 Sarala Rekhalu (Short Stories) 2022

References

Further reading 
 Oka Anveshi, Konni Alochanalu, Interview in Andhra Jyothy Daily, 09-01-2017. Retrieved 20 August 2018.
 Darbhasayanam Srinivasacharya, Srujana Maha Drudham, Ati Mrudulam, An article in Sakshi Daily, 26-12-2016. Retrieved 20 August 2018.
 Rajanigandha, Collection of Poems, 2013. https://www.anandbooks.com/Rajanigandha. Retrieved 20 August 2018.
 Sahityam-Moulika Bhavanalu. http://www.anandbooks.com/Sahityam-Moulika%20Bhavanalu. Retrieved 20 August 2018.
 Talli! Ninnu Dalanchi. http://kinige.com/book/Tallee+Ninnu+Dalanchi. Retrieved 20 August 2018.
 Anveshana, Collection of essays on Papineni Literature, 21 February 2019.

Telugu poets
Indian poets
Living people
20th-century Indian poets
1953 births
Recipients of the Sahitya Akademi Award in Telugu